Three Bad Men may stand for:

3 Bad Men, a 1926 Western film directed by John Ford
Three Bad Men (2005 film), a 2005 Western film directed by Jeff Hathcock
Three Bad Men (2008 film), a 2008 crime/action film directed by Danny Torres